Pharyngolepis is an extinct genus of primitive jawless fish that lived in the Silurian period of what is now Norway.
 
Pharyngolepis had  well-developed anal and caudal fins, but no paired or dorsal fins that would have helped stabilise it in the water, and so was probably a poor swimmer, remaining close to the sea bottom. The pectoral fins were instead replaced by bony spines, possibly for protection against predators, and there was a row of spines along the back. It probably scooped up food from the ocean floor.

References

Fossil taxa described in 1911
Birkeniiformes genera
Silurian fish of Europe